The Chetnik Command was a military operation plan of the Yugoslav government in an expected invasion of Yugoslavia. It was part of the military plans to lead guerrilla warfare, earlier developed. It was established in April 1940, including the organization of six complete and one incomplete battalion recruited from the regular Royal Yugoslav Army on voluntary basis. The six battalions (known as "assault battalions", or "Chetnik battalions") were added to each Field Army (of which there were seven), placed in Novi Sad, Sarajevo, Skopje, Karlovac, Niš and Mostar. Its headquarters was transferred from Novi Sad to Kraljevo in south-central Serbia on 1 April. Between 10 July 1940 and 1 April 1941 the official name was the Assault Command. Although a traditional notion, the Yugoslav military did not use the Chetnik idea in its military planning until 1940. It had little support in the highest ranks whose views were formed in World War I. It had the rank of Division, and was directly subordinated to the Ministry of the Army and Navy. The first commander was division general Mihailo Mihailović. It was activated on 1 April 1941 and saw action in the April War (6–18 April 1941). The Chetnik Command had no relation to the pre-war Chetnik associations and the later Chetnik Movement of Draža Mihailović.


Units
1. Novi Sad
2. Sarajevo
3. Skoplje
4. Karlovac
5. Niš
6. Mostar
7. Kraljevo

Invasion of Yugoslavia

See also
Yugoslav order of battle prior to the invasion of Yugoslavia

References

Sources

 
 
 
 
 
 
 
 
  

Royal Yugoslav Army
1940 establishments in Yugoslavia
1940s establishments in Serbia
1941 disestablishments in Yugoslavia
Military operations of World War II
Military plans
Guerrilla warfare
Military units and formations established in 1940
Military units and formations disestablished in 1941
1941 in Yugoslavia
April 1941 events
Special forces